Portrait of a Damaged Family is the fourth and final full-length album by Miracle Legion, and the only recorded on The Mezzotint Label, released in 1996.

Release
Portrait of a Damaged Family was released under The Mezzotint Label in 1996 on CD only. In 2016, the album was re-released on vinyl, CD, and digital formats. This reissue featured a revised track listing and artwork.

Track listing (original 1996 release)
All songs written by Mark Mulcahy and Ray Neal, except where noted

Personnel
Mark Mulcahy - vocals
Ray Neal - guitar
Scott Boutier - drums
Dave McCaffrey - bass

References

1996 albums
Miracle Legion albums